Wlnsvey Campos (first name pronounced wins-vay) (born November 30, 1995) is an American politician who serves in the Oregon State Senate. She assumed office in January 2023.

Early life and education 
Campos was born in Los Angeles, California, the daughter of immigrants, and raised in Bandon, Oregon. She earned a Bachelor of Arts degree in political science and philosophy from Pacific University.

Career 
Since graduating from college, Campos has worked as a caseworker for Family Promise of Beaverton, a homeless shelter in Washington County, Oregon. She also managed a campaign for the Hillsboro School Board and was a political organizer for the Oregon Nurses Association and Our Oregon.

Political career
After incumbent representative Jeff Barker opted not to seek re-election to the Oregon House of Representatives, Campos announced her candidacy to succeed him. After winning the Democratic primary, she defeated Republican Daniel Martin. She assumed office on January 11, 2021. Only 24 at the time of election, Campos was one of the youngest state legislators in the United States. She was sworn in on January 11, 2021. Campos then ran for a seat in the Oregon Senate in 2022, and won election to Senate District 18, becoming the youngest ever state senator in Oregon.

References 

Living people
1995 births
Hispanic and Latino American state legislators in Oregon
Hispanic and Latino American women in politics
People from Bandon, Oregon
People from Aloha, Oregon
Democratic Party members of the Oregon House of Representatives
Pacific University alumni
21st-century American women